Fatty and Mabel Adrift is a 1916 Keystone short comedy film starring Roscoe "Fatty" Arbuckle, Mabel Normand, and Al St. John.

Plot 
The story involves Arbuckle as a farm boy marrying his sweetheart, Normand. They have their honeymoon with Fatty's dog Luke, at a cottage on the seashore. At high tide that night, Al St. John (Fatty's rival) and his confederates set the cottage adrift. Fatty and Mabel awaken the next morning to find themselves surrounded by water in their bedroom, and the house afloat.

Cast

 Roscoe 'Fatty' Arbuckle as Fatty
 Mabel Normand as Mabel
 Al St. John as Hiram Perkins' son
 Joe Bordeaux as Henchman
 Jimmy Bryant as Henchman
 Glen Cavender as I. Landem, Realtor
 Luke the Dog as himself
 Frank Hayes as Mabel's father
 Wayland Trask as Brutus Bombastic, Chief Criminal
 Mai Wells as Mabel's mother (as May Wells)

Critical response 

Variety in its 1916 review gives the film a positive review, commenting that "the picture is amusing with some new and good effects, without the customary dose of messy slapstick one expects in a Keystone with these principals." As was often the case in contemporary reviews of Arbuckle films, the direction of the film is singled out for praise, although it is not mentioned that Arbuckle himself is the director. The review mentions "a dandy lightning storm is a feature of the film and there are some pretty views of breakers rushing on to the shore." The review also contends that Al St. John's performance is not as good as his usual work for Keystone but adds, "The picture is a sure laugh maker and as it is fairly clean, it is the more worthy."

Fatty and Mabel Adrift was the closing movie of the 56-film Arbuckle retrospective at the Museum of Modern Art in New York City in April and May 2006. Prior to the presentation of this short, the event's curators cited the film as their favorite of Arbuckle's screen productions.

See also
 List of American films of 1916
 Fatty Arbuckle filmography
 Dave Douglas' Keystone (album), a new soundtrack for the film.

References

External links

 
 Fatty and Mabel Adrift - Movie short
 Fatty and Mabel Adrift available for free download at Internet Archive

1916 films
1916 comedy films
American silent short films
Silent American comedy films
American black-and-white films
Films directed by Roscoe Arbuckle
Keystone Studios films
Triangle Film Corporation films
Films shot in Fort Lee, New Jersey
1916 short films
Films with screenplays by Roscoe Arbuckle
American comedy short films
1910s American films
1910s English-language films